Ummeed may refer to:
 Ummeed (1941 film), a Bollywood film
 Ummeed (1962 film), a Bollywood Hindi film